James Phillip Leo (born June 18, 1937) is a former American football player who played with the New York Giants and Minnesota Vikings. He played college football at the University of Cincinnati.

References

1937 births
Living people
American football defensive ends
Cincinnati Bearcats football players
New York Giants players
Minnesota Vikings players
Players of American football from New York (state)
Sportspeople from Niagara Falls, New York